Elena Likhovtseva and Anastasia Myskina were the defending champions, but Myskina chose not to compete that year. Likhovtseva partnered with Elena Vesnina.

Vera Dushevina and Tatiana Perebiynis won in the final 7-5, 3-6, [10-2] against Likhovtseva and Vesnina.

Seeds

  Mara Santangelo   Katarina Srebotnik (semifinals)
  Elena Likhovtseva   Elena Vesnina (final)
  Meilen Tu   Galina Voskoboeva (quarterfinals)
  Jarmila Gajdošová   Vladimíra Uhlířová (first round)

Draw

Draw

External links
 Draw

Warsaw Open
JandS Cup